Laran District is in Shahrekord County, Chaharmahal and Bakhtiari province, Iran. At the 2006 census, its population was 32,705 in 7,566 households. The following census in 2011 counted 32,791 people in 8,882 households. At the latest census in 2016, the district had 32,863 inhabitants living in 9,656 households.

References 

Shahrekord County

Districts of Chaharmahal and Bakhtiari Province

Populated places in Chaharmahal and Bakhtiari Province

Populated places in Shahr-e Kord County